Dixie, Idaho may refer to:
Dixie, Elmore County, Idaho, an unincorporated community
Dixie, Idaho County, Idaho, an unincorporated community